MCN: The American Journal of Maternal/Child Nursing is a bimonthly peer-reviewed healthcare journal of obstetrical nursing and neonatal nursing.

See also
 Journal of Obstetric, Gynecologic, & Neonatal Nursing
 Neonatal Network: The Journal of Neonatal Nursing
 List of nursing journals

Obstetrical nursing journals
Pediatric nursing journals
Monthly journals
Lippincott Williams & Wilkins academic journals
English-language journals